Odradek is a creature in Franz Kafka's The Cares of a Family Man. 

Odradek may also refer to:
 Odradek, Táboritská 8, Prague, 18 July 1994, a 1994 piece by Jeff Wall
 Odradek a 2009 album by Daniel Menche
 Odradek, a 2011 play by Brett Neveu